Petrovskoye is a rural locality (a village) in Kaltovsky Selsoviet, Iglinsky District, Bashkortostan, Russia. The population was 15 as of 2010. In the district there are 3 streets.

Geography 
Petrovskoye is located 34 km southeast of Iglino (the district's administrative centre) by road. Kommunar is the nearest rural locality.

References 

Rural localities in Iglinsky District